"'I'm the Answer'" is a song by Simon Townshend, the younger brother of The Who's guitarist Pete Townshend, originally released in 1983. The song is the second track and the first single from Simon Townshend's debut solo album, Sweet Sound.

"I'm the Answer" features Pete Townshend singing backing vocals. There were two singles lifted from the album, "So Real" and "I'm the Answer", but neither got much album-oriented rock radio play. "I'm the Answer" was the only song to feature a music video, which was played on MTV. Simon Townshend was interviewed with Pete Townshend about the album. MTV mistakenly credited "Peter Townshend" as the artist for the song.

12" release
The 12" version of the single was released in 1984. It features the full length version of "I'm the Answer" and the rare non-album track "Into the Memory", as well as "Heart Stops", the closing track from Sweet Sound.

Other releases
Simon Townshend re-recorded the song for the 1999 album Animal Soup.

Personnel
 Simon Townshend - Lead vocals, Lead guitar
Additional personnel
 Steve Barnacle - Bass guitar
 Mark Brzezicki - Drums
 Pete Townshend - Backing vocals
Engineering
 Bill Price - Engineer

References

1983 singles
1983 songs
Polydor Records singles